Andreja Valušek (born 11 July 1984) is a Croatian footballer who plays as a midfielder. She had played for the Croatia women's national team.

Career
Valušek has been capped for the Croatia national team, appearing for the team during the 2019 FIFA Women's World Cup qualifying cycle.

References

External links
 
 
 

1984 births
Living people
Croatian women's footballers
Croatia women's international footballers
Women's association football midfielders